The ephebic oath was an oath sworn by young men of Classical Athens, typically eighteen-year-old sons of Athenian citizens, upon induction into the military academy, the Ephebic College, graduation from which was required to attain status as citizens.  The applicant would have been dressed in full armour, shield and spear in his left hand, his right hand raised and touching the right hand of the moderator.  The oath was quoted by the Attic orator Lycurgus, in his work Against Leocrates (4th century BC), though it is certainly archaic (5th century BC). The Ephebate, an organization for training the young men of Athens, chiefly in military matters, had existed since the 5th century but was reorganized by Lycurgus. The oath was taken in the temple of Aglaurus, daughter of Cecrops, probably at the age of eighteen when the youth underwent an examination (Greek: δοκιμασία) and had his name entered on the deme register. He was then an ephebos until the age of twenty.

The oath
The ephebic oath is preserved on an inscription from Acharnae, which was written in the mid-fourth century BC.  Other versions of the oath are preserved in the works of Stobaeus and Pollux.

Greek text 
This is the oath, as preserved by Stobaeus.

"Οὐ καταισχυνῶ τὰ ὅπλα τὰ ἱερὰ, οὐδ' ἐγκαταλείψω τὸν παραστάτην ὅτῳ ἂν στοιχήσω· ἀμυνῶ δὲ καὶ ὑπὲρ ἱερῶν καὶ ὁσίων καὶ μόνος καὶ μετὰ πολλῶν. καὶ τὴν πατρίδα οὐκ ἐλάσσω παραδώσω, πλείω δὲ καὶ ἀρείω ὅσης ἂν παραδέξωμαι. καὶ εὐηκοήσω τῶν ἀεὶ κραινόντων ἐμφρόνως καὶ τοῖς θεσμοῖς τοῖς ἰδρυμένοις πείσομαι καὶ οὕστινας ἂν ἄλλους τὸ πλῆθος ἰδρύσηται ὁμοφρόνως·καὶ ἂν τις ἀναιρῇ τοὺς θεσμοὺς ἢ μὴ πείθηται οὐκ ἐπιτρέψω, ἀμυνῶ δὲ καὶ μόνος καὶ μετὰ πολλῶν. καὶ ἱερὰ τὰ πάτρια τιμήσω. ἵστορες τούτων Ἄγλαυρος, Ἐνυάλιος, Ἄρης, Ζεύς, Θαλλώ, Αὐξώ, Ἡγεμόνη.

English translation 
I will never bring reproach upon my hallowed arms, nor will I desert the comrade at whose side I stand, but I will defend our altars and our hearths, single-handed or supported by many.  My native land I will not leave a diminished heritage but greater and better than when I received it.  I will obey whoever is in authority and submit to the established laws and all others which the people shall harmoniously enact.  If anyone tries to overthrow the constitution or disobeys it, I will not permit him, but will come to its defense, single-handed or with the support of all.  I will honor the religion of my fathers.  Let the gods be my witness, Agraulus, Enyalius, Ares, Zeus, Thallo, Auxo, Hegemone.

Modern use
The oath has been revived for use in educational institutions worldwide as a statement of civic virtue.

Examples

References

Ancient Athens
Oaths